Michael P. Mulrooney (born December 31, 1955) is an American politician. He was a Democratic member of the Delaware House of Representatives from 1999 to 2019, representing District 17. He graduated from John Dickinson High School and apprenticed with the International Brotherhood of Electrical Workers.

Electoral history
In 1998, Mulrooney won the general election with 2,418 votes (53.5%) against Republican nominee Douglas Salter to replace retiring Republican Jeffrey G. Mack.
In 2000, Mulrooney won the general election with 5,127 votes (74.0%) against Republican nominee Michael Shaw.
In 2002, Mulrooney was unopposed in the general election, winning 4,340 votes.
In 2004, Mulrooney won his only challenge in the Democratic primary with 1,198 votes (79.3%), and went on to win the general election with 6,590 votes (81.9%) against Republican nominee Phillip Simpkins.
In 2006, Mulrooney won the general election with 4,619 votes (84.2%) against Republican nominee David Osborn.
In 2008, Mulrooney won the general election with 6,981 votes (83.4%) in a rematch against Republican nominee David Osborn.
In 2010, Mulrooney was unopposed in the general election, winning 5,108 votes.
In 2012, Mulrooney won the general election with 7,297 votes (81.1%) against Republican nominee Laura Brown.
In 2014, Mulrooney was unopposed in the general election, winning 3,860 votes.
In 2016, Mulrooney was unopposed in the general election, winning 7,721 votes.

References

External links
Official page at the Delaware General Assembly
 

Place of birth missing (living people)
1955 births
Living people
Democratic Party members of the Delaware House of Representatives
People from Kent County, Delaware
21st-century American politicians